Setyana Daniella Florensia Mapasa (born 15 August 1995) is an Australian badminton player. Mapasa won a silver medal at the 2013 BWF World Junior Championships mixed team when she represented Indonesia. She officially became an Australian citizen in 2014. She was selected to join the national team compete at the 2018 Commonwealth Games in Gold Coast, Australia. She was four times women's doubles Oceania champions from 2017 to 2020 with her partner Gronya Somerville, also two times champion in the mixed doubles event in 2017 and 2018 alongside Sawan Serasinghe.

Mapasa represented Australia at the 2020 Summer Olympics. She played in badminton women's doubles with her partner, Gronya Somerville, winning one and losing the other. They finished third and were therefore eliminated.

Early years 
Setyana Mapasa, living in Indonesia, started playing badminton when she was 8-years-old. Badminton is a big part of the Indonesian culture and her parents played socially. Mapasa is a left handed player and turned professional at the age of 13. She made her international debut in 2013.

Achievements

Oceania Championships 
Women's doubles

Mixed doubles

BWF World Tour (1 title) 
The BWF World Tour, which was announced on 19 March 2017 and implemented in 2018, is a series of elite badminton tournaments sanctioned by the Badminton World Federation (BWF). The BWF World Tour is divided into levels of World Tour Finals, Super 1000, Super 750, Super 500, Super 300 (part of the HSBC World Tour), and the BWF Tour Super 100.

Women's doubles

BWF Grand Prix (2 titles, 1 runner-up) 
The BWF Grand Prix had two levels, the Grand Prix and Grand Prix Gold. It was a series of badminton tournaments sanctioned by the Badminton World Federation (BWF) and played between 2007 and 2017.

Women's doubles

Mixed doubles

  BWF Grand Prix Gold tournament
  BWF Grand Prix tournament

BWF International Challenge/Series (11 titles, 7 runners-up) 
Women's doubles

Mixed doubles

  BWF International Challenge tournament
  BWF International Series tournament
  BWF Future Series tournament

Performance timeline

National team 
 Junior level

 Senior level

Individual competitions 
 Junior level

 Senior level

References

External links 

 
 

1995 births
Living people
People from Minahasa Regency
Sportspeople from North Sulawesi
Indonesian female badminton players
Australian people of Indonesian descent
Sportspeople from Melbourne
Australian female badminton players
Badminton players at the 2020 Summer Olympics
Olympic badminton players of Australia
Badminton players at the 2018 Commonwealth Games
Commonwealth Games competitors for Australia
20th-century Indonesian women
21st-century Indonesian women
21st-century Australian women
Indonesian emigrants to Australia